Landscape with Tobias and Raphael is a 1639-40 painting by Claude Lorrain, one of a series of paintings commissioned from the artist for the Palacio del Buen Retiro and now in the Prado Museum in Madrid.

References

1640 paintings
Paintings by Claude Lorrain
Landscape paintings
Paintings of the Museo del Prado by French artists
Paintings of Raphael (archangel)
Paintings depicting Tobias